Yunyangosaurus (meaning "Yunyang County lizard") is a genus of possible megalosauroid dinosaur from the Xintiangou Formation in Chongqing, China. The type and only species is Yunyangosaurus puanensis. The name was first published in the 2019 SVP abstract book by Hui (2019) before it was formally described in 2020.

The specimen consists of a disarticulated partial skeleton consisting of  "eleven presacral vertebrae, several cervical and dorsal ribs and chevrons." Judging from the remains, the animal would have been 4.7 meters (15.4 feet) long.

References 

Prehistoric tetanurans
Middle Jurassic dinosaurs of Asia
Jurassic China
Fossil taxa described in 2020
Megalosaurs
Taxa named by Xu Xing